Kalauao station (also known as Pearlridge station) is an under construction Honolulu Rail Transit station in Waimalu, Hawaii, serving Pearlridge Center.

The Hawaiian Station Name Working Group proposed Hawaiian names for the nine rail stations on the Ewa end of the rail system (stations west of and including Aloha Stadium) in November 2017, and HART adopted the proposed names on February 22, 2018. The Hawaiian name initially proposed for the station, Puʻuloa, means "long hill" and refers to an ʻili that marked the entrance to the bays of Puʻuloa. Kalauao means "the multitude of clouds" and refers to an ahupuaʻa.

References

External links
 

Aiea, Hawaii
Honolulu Rail Transit stations
Railway stations scheduled to open in 2023